Eileen Quiring O'Brien (born March 2, 1948) is an American politician who served as a member of the Clark County Council from 2017 to 2022. A member of the Republican Party, she represented the 4th district from 2017 to 2019 and later served as the chair of the council, representing the at-large district from 2019 to 2022 and the 5th district in 2022.

References 

Living people
Clark County Councillors
Republican Party members of the Oregon House of Representatives
Republican Party Oregon state senators
People from York, Nebraska
Washington (state) Republicans
Women state legislators in Oregon
1948 births